The following events occurred in April 1963:

April 1, 1963 (Monday)
The long-running American TV soap opera General Hospital made its début on the ABC network. On the same afternoon, the first episode of NBC's hospital soap opera, The Doctors, premiered. General Hospital, set in the fictional town of Port Charles, New York, would begin its 60th year in 2022, while The Doctors, set in the fictional New England town of Madison, would end on December 31, 1982.
The Titan II-Gemini Coordination Committee was established to direct efforts to reduce longitudinal vibration (POGO) in the Titan II and to improve engine reliability. Air Force Space Systems Division (SSD) and Aerospace had presented to NASA and the Air Force a series of briefings on the POGO problem that culminated in a briefing to the Gemini Program Planning Board. The main problem was that POGO level satisfactory in the weapon system was too high to meet NASA standards for the Gemini program, and further reduction in the POGO level required a much more elaborate and extensive analytic and experimental program than had so far been considered necessary. The board approved the SSD/Aerospace proposals and established a committee to oversee work toward a POGO remedy. The high-level committee was composed of officials from Air Force Ballistic Systems Division, SSD, Space Technology Laboratories, and Aerospace.
Died: Quinim Pholsena, 47, the Foreign Minister of Laos, was assassinated by a soldier assigned to guard him. Quinim and his wife had returned home from a reception with the King, when Lance Corporal Chy Kong fired a machine gun at the couple. Minister Quinim was hit by 18 bullets, after which the guard "finished him off with a shot through the head".

April 2, 1963 (Tuesday)
Singapore television channel Saluran 5 Television Singapura began the regular service in the Asian nation, with four hours of programming every evening.
The Soviet Union launched Luna 4 at 8:04 am UT toward the Moon, using a curving path rather than a straight trajectory.
The Beatles began their Spring 1963 UK tour in Sheffield, England.
The Navy of Argentina began a revolt against the government of President José María Guido, with the insurrection starting at Puerto Belgrano. The rebellion would quietly end the next day.
Testifying before the Subcommittee on Manned Space Flight of the U.S. House Committee on Science and Astronautics, D. Brainerd Holmes, Director of Manned Space Flight, sought to justify a $42.638 million increase in Project Gemini's actual 1963 budget over that previously estimated. Holmes explained: "This increase is identified primarily with an increase of $49.9 million in spacecraft. The fiscal 1963 congressional budget request was made at the suggestion of the contractor. The increase reflects McDonnell's six months of actual experience in 1963." The subcommittee was perturbed that the contractor could so drastically underestimate Gemini costs, especially since it was chosen without competition because of supposed competence derived from Project Mercury experience. Holmes attributed McDonnell's underestimate to unexpectedly high bids from subcontractors and provided for the record a statement of some of the reasons for the change: "These original estimates made in December 1961 by NASA and McDonnell were based on minimum changes from Mercury technology ..... As detailed specifications for subsystems performance were developed ....... realistic cost estimates, not previously available, were obtained from subcontractors. The first of these ....... were obtained by McDonnell in April 1962 and revealed significantly higher estimates than were originally used. For example: (a) In data transmission, it became necessary to change from a Mercury-type system to a pulse code modulation (PCM) system because of increased data transmission requirements, and the need to reduce weight and electrical power. The Gemini data transmission system will be directly applicable to Apollo. (b) Other subsystems have a similar history. The rendezvous radar was originally planned to be similar to ones used by the Bomarc Missile, but it was found necessary to design an interferometer type radar for low weight, small volume, and to provide the highest reliability possible. (c) The environmental control system was originally planned as two Mercury-type systems, but as the detail specifications became definitive it was apparent that the Mercury ECS was inadequate and, although extensive use of Mercury design techniques were utilized, major modifications were required."
NASA announced the signing of a contract with McDonnell for the Gemini spacecraft. Final negotiations had been completed February 27, 1963. Estimated cost was $428,780,062 with a fixed fee of $27,870,000 for a total estimated cost-plus-fixed-fee of $456,650,062. NASA Headquarters spent two weeks on a detailed review of the contract before signing. Development of the spacecraft had begun in December 1961 under a preliminary letter contract which the final contract superseded. The contract called for 13 flight-rated spacecraft, 12 to be used in space flight, one to be used for ground testing. In addition, McDonnell would provide two mission simulator trainers, a docking simulator trainer, five boilerplates, and three static articles for vibration and impact ground tests.

April 3, 1963 (Wednesday)
Southern Christian Leadership Conference (SCLC) volunteers kicked off the Birmingham campaign in Birmingham, Alabama, against racial segregation in the United States, with a sit-in.
The Delaware Supreme Court upheld their state's law, unique in the United States, permitting the flogging of criminals.  Although the penalty, dating from colonial days, had not been carried out for several years, a 20-year-old man had been given a probated sentence of 20 lashes for auto theft, then violated the probation.

April 4, 1963 (Thursday)
All 67 people on board Aeroflot Flight 25 were killed, one hour after the Ilyushin-18 plane had taken off from Moscow's Sheremetyevo Airport, bound for Krasnoyarsk.
Network Ten, the third television network in Australia, began with the granting of a corporate operating license to United Telecasters Sydney Limited.  Broadcasting would begin on ATV-0 in Melbourne on April 1, 1964, and on Channel Ten in Sydney on April 5, 1965.
The cost of making a long-distance telephone call was lowered throughout the continental United States, with a maximum charge of one dollar for three-minute "station-to-station" calls made between 9:00 pm and 4:30 a.m.  The equivalent 50 years later for a 1963 dollar would be $7.50
The Henry Miller novel Tropic of Cancer went on sale legally in the United Kingdom for the first time, after having been banned for thirty years because it had been deemed obscene.
The Beatles performed at Stowe School in Buckinghamshire, UK, for a fee of £100, having accepted a personal request from schoolboy David Moores, a fellow Liverpudlian (and later chairman of Liverpool F.C.).
Died: 
Gaetano Catanoso, 84, Italian parish priest canonized by Pope Benedict XVI in 2005 
Sonja McCaskie, 24, British skier and 1960 Olympics competitor, murdered

April 5, 1963 (Friday)
Ferdinand Marcos became President of the Senate of the Philippines.

The Soviet Union accepted an American proposal to establish a Moscow–Washington hotline so that the leaders of the two nations could communicate directly with each other in order to avoid war. Originally, the hot line was a teletype system rather than a direct voice line.
On April 5 and 6, Gordon Cooper and Alan Shepard, Mercury-Atlas 9 (MA-9) pilot and backup pilot, visited the Morehead Planetarium in North Carolina to review the celestial sphere model, practice star navigation, and observe a simulation of the flashing light beacon (an experiment planned for the MA-9 mission).

April 6, 1963 (Saturday)
The South African Soccer League, formed in 1961, was banned from further use of public stadiums because its teams included white, black and mixed race players, in violation of the Group Areas Act, and a game at Alberton, a suburb of Johannesburg, was cancelled on the day of the match.  Fans climbed the fence surrounding the locked Natalspruit Indian Sports ground and 15,000 people watched the Moroka Swallows defeat Blackpool United, 6–1.  Afterwards, the SASL was permanently denied access to playing fields, and disbanded in 1967 after years of financial losses.
Boots Randolph, better-known as an accompanist for many performers in rock, pop, and country music, had his only U.S. hit, reaching no 1 on the Billboard chart with "Yakety Sax".
The Germany national rugby union team played a friendly international against a France XV at Frankfurt, losing 9-15.
Born: Rafael Correa, President of Ecuador since 2007, in Guayaquil
Died: 
Otto Struve, 65, Russian astronomer 
Allen Whipple, 81, pioneering American cancer surgeon

April 7, 1963 (Sunday)
Harold Holt, at that time the Treasurer of Australia, announced that Australia would introduce decimal currency in February, 1966. The Australian pound, worth 20 shillings and 240 pence, would be replaced by the Australian dollar, worth 100 cents, on February 14, 1966.
In Kenya, a bus returning from an African church meeting in Mitaboni township with 82 people ran off of the edge of a bridge and plunged into the Tiva River. Only the driver and nine other people were able to escape. Police recovered 58 bodies while 14 other people had been trapped in the wreckage under water. <ref>"72 Africans Die In Crash of Bus", UPI report in '"Shreveport (LA) Times, April 9, 1963, p. 4</ref>
Yugoslavia was proclaimed to be a "socialist federative republic", and Josip Broz Tito was named President for Life. Tito would remain President until his death in 1980.
At more than 700 pages, the first full Sunday edition of The New York Times since the end of the printer's strike set a record for the size of a newspaper.
At Augusta National Golf Club, 23-year-old Jack Nicklaus won the 27th Masters Tournament, becoming the youngest player to win the Masters. Nicklaus finished one stroke ahead of Tony Lema, 286 to 287.

April 8, 1963 (Monday)
In the Canadian federal election, the Liberal Party, led by Lester B. Pearson, won 128 of the 265 seats in Canada's House of Commons, while Prime Minister John Diefenbaker's Progressive Conservatives lost 21 seats and its control of the House.  Pearson would replace Diefenbaker as Prime Minister on April 22.
At the 35th Academy Awards ceremony, Lawrence of Arabia won the Best Picture Oscar. Gregory Peck won Best Actor for To Kill a Mockingbird, while Anne Bancroft won Best Actress for portraying Helen Keller's teacher in The Miracle Worker.
In race to represent the Pontiac–Témiscamingue district of Quebec in Canada's House of Commons, the two candidates, Progressive Conservative Paul Martineau and Liberal Paul-Oliva Goulet both received 6,448 votes. Under the system at the time for breaking a tie, the district's returning officer in charge of counting the votes decided in favor of Martineau.
Born: Julian Lennon, British musician, songwriter, actor, and photographer, son of John and Cynthia Lennon, in Liverpool

April 9, 1963 (Tuesday)

Sir Winston Churchill, the former Prime Minister of the United Kingdom, became the first person to be made an honorary citizen of the United States by act of the U.S. Congress. President Kennedy signed the legislation for the 88-year-old statesman, whose mother Jennie Jerome Churchill, had been a United States native. The House of Representatives had approved the legislation on March 12 by a 377–21 vote, and the U.S. Senate approved on April 2 by voice vote. Churchill was unable to travel from the U.K. to the U.S., and his son, Randolph Churchill, accepted in his place in ceremonies that were televised.
Langley Research Center personnel visited Cape Canaveral to provide assistance in preparing the tethered balloon experiment for the Mercury-Atlas 9 (MA-9) mission. This work involved installing force measuring beams, soldered at four terminals, to which the lead wires were fastened.
George M. Low, Director of Spacecraft and Flight Missions, Office of Manned Space Flight, explained to the House Subcommittee on Manned Space Flight why eight Gemini rendezvous missions were planned.
Despite his party's loss in the elections for the House of Commons, Canada's Prime Minister Diefenbaker said that he would not resign until the new Parliament was called into session.
The popular children's book Where the Wild Things Are, by Maurice Sendak, was published for the first time, issued by Harper & Row.

April 10, 1963 (Wednesday)
The owners and passengers of the yacht Cythera became the first modern victims of piracy (under Australian law) when their boat was stolen by two crew members. The yacht was salvaged over a month later, and the incident would result in various legal complications, including prosecution of the pirates under an act of 1858.
Frol Kozlov, the 54-year-old Second Secretary of the Soviet Communist Party and Deputy Prime Minister, considered the likely successor to Nikita Khrushchev, had a stroke and was forced to retire. Kozlov would die on January 30, 1965.

The wreckage of Thresher would be located on October 1, 1964.
On April 10 and 11, full-scale recovery and egress training was conducted for Gordon Cooper and Alan Shepard in preparation for the MA-9 mission. During the exercise, egresses were effected from the Mercury spacecraft with subsequent helicopter pickup and dinghy boarding. The deployment and use of survival equipment were also practiced.
An unknown gunman narrowly missed killing former U.S. Army General Edwin A. Walker, who had been working on his taxes at his home in Dallas, Texas. The would-be killer would later be claimed to have been Lee Harvey Oswald, who would allegedly use the same rifle to assassinate U.S. President John F. Kennedy in November.

April 11, 1963 (Thursday)
Pope John XXIII issued his final encyclical, Pacem in terris, entitled On Establishing Universal Peace in Truth, Justice, Charity and Liberty, the first papal encyclical addressed to "all men of good will", rather than to Roman Catholics only.
Mohamed Khemisti, the 33-year-old Minister of Foreign Affairs of Algeria, was mortally wounded by a gunman who shot him outside the National Assembly.
Buddy Rogers became the first WWF Champion, defeating Antonino Rocca at the finals of the first World Wrestling Federation tournament, held in Rio de Janeiro, Brazil.
The U.S. Chief of Naval Operations went before the press corps at the Pentagon to announce that the nuclear submarine USS Thresher had been lost with all hands.
Christopher C. Kraft, Jr., John D. Hodge, and William L. Davidson of Manned Spacecraft Center (MSC)'s Flight Operations Division met at Langley with a large contingent of that Center's research staff to discuss LaRC's proposed Manned Orbital Research Laboratory (MORL). Langley spokesmen briefed their Houston visitors on the philosophy and proposed program phases leading to an operational MORL. Kraft and his colleagues then emphasized the need for careful study of operational problems involved with the MORL, as well as those associated with the smaller crew ferry and logistics supply vehicles. Specifically, they cited crew selection and training requirements, the need for a continuous recovery capability, communications requirements, and handling procedures for scientific data.
Born:
Saif al-Adel, Egyptian-born al-Qaeda terrorist
June Gibbons and Jennifer Gibbons (died 1993), the "Silent Twins", criminals and writers, in Barbados

April 12, 1963 (Friday)
Martin Luther King Jr., Ralph Abernathy, Fred Shuttlesworth and others were arrested in a Birmingham, Alabama, protest for "parading without a permit".
The Soviet nuclear powered submarine K-33 collided with the Finnish merchant vessel M/S Finnclipper in the Danish Straits. Although severely damaged, both vessels made it to port.
Died:
Herbie Nichols, 44, American jazz pianist and composer, of leukemia 
Kazimierz Ajdukiewicz, 72, Polish philosopher and logician

April 13, 1963 (Saturday)
Divers discovered the wreckage of the Dutch ship Vergulde Draeck almost 307 years after it sank off the coast of Australia. The vessel, carrying 193 people, had gone down on April 28, 1656, with 118 drowning. Three centuries later, a group of skindivers found the wreck  from Ledge Point, Western Australia.
United States Marine Corps UH-34 Seahorse transport helicopters based at Da Nang, South Vietnam, airlifted 435 South Vietnamese troops to attack a suspected Viet Cong stronghold in mountains along the Thu Bồn River. For the first time, Marine Corps helicopters received an attack helicopter escort, in the form of United States Army UH-1B gunships.
The USSR launched Kosmos 14 from Kapustin Yar aboard a Kosmos-2I 63S1 carrier rocket.
The UK's Independent Labour Party held its 71st Annual Conference, at Bradford.
Pete Rose of the Cincinnati Reds got the first of a record 4,256 hits in a Major League Baseball game, hitting a triple off a pitch by Bob Friend of the Pittsburgh Pirates. The Reds lost, 12–4.
Born: Garry Kasparov, Russian/Soviet chess grandmaster, and world champion 1985–1993; as Garik Kimovich Weinstein in Baku, Azerbaijan SSR
Died: Babu Gulabrai, 75, Indian Hindi writer

April 14, 1963 (Sunday)
The Institute of Mental Health (Belgrade) was established.
Born: Cynthia Cooper, American women's basketball player, MVP of the WNBA for 1996-97 and 1997-98 for the Houston Comets; in Chicago

April 15, 1963 (Monday)
Seventy thousand marchers arrived in London from Aldermaston, to demonstrate against nuclear weapons. The breakaway group Spies for Peace set up a picket at RSG-6.
British driver Innes Ireland won the 1963 Glover Trophy motor race, held at Goodwood Circuit.
British driver Jim Clark won the 1963 Pau Grand Prix motor race, held at Pau Circuit.
A White House press release announced that First Lady Jackie Kennedy was pregnant and that her baby would be delivered by Caesarean section in September. Mrs. Kennedy, who had a history of miscarriages, had delayed announcement of her pregnancy. She had been delivered of stillborn children in 1955 and 1956, and had two living children, Caroline (born 1957) and John Jr. (b. 1960). The child, Patrick Bouvier Kennedy, would be born prematurely on August 7, and would survive for only two days.
The Manned Spacecraft Center published a detailed flight plan for the Mercury-Atlas 9 mission, and the assumption was made that the mission would be nominal, with any required changes being made by the flight director. Scheduled experiments, observations, and studies would be conducted in a manner that would not conflict with the operational requirements. Due to the extended duration of the flight, an 8-hour sleep period was programed, with a 2-hour option factor as to when the astronaut would begin his rest period. This time came well within the middle phases of the planned flight and would allow the astronaut ample opportunity to be in an alert state before retro-sequence. In addition to the general guidelines, the astronaut had practically a minute-to-minute series of tasks to accomplish.
An unidentified 58-year-old man, with lung cancer, was admitted to the University of Mississippi hospital. On June 11, 1963, he would become the first person to receive a lung transplant.
Died: "Colossus", the largest snake ever kept in captivity, at the Highland Park Zoo in Pittsburgh. A reticulated Python, she measured 28 1/2 feet long (8.68 meters) and at one time weighed 320 pounds (145 kg).

April 16, 1963 (Tuesday)
Martin Luther King Jr. issued his Letter from Birmingham Jail.
From April 16 to 17, an MA-9 mission briefing was conducted for the astronauts and Project Mercury support personnel. Subjects under discussion included recovery procedures, network communications, spacecraft systems, flight plan activities, and mission rules.
Born:
Saleem Malik, Pakistani cricketer and national team captain, in Lahore
"Little" Jimmy Osmond, American singer, actor, and businessman, in Canoga Park, California

April 17, 1963 (Wednesday)
Grigori Nelyubov, Ivan Anikeyev and Valentin Filatyev were all dismissed from the USSR's cosmonaut corps, after their March 27 arrest for drunk and disorderly conduct.
Representatives of Egypt, Syria and Iraq signed a declaration in Cairo to merge their three nations into a new United Arab Republic. Egypt and Syria had been merged as the United Arab Republic from 1958 to 1961 before Syria withdrew, and Egypt and retained the UAR name. Demonstrations followed in Jordan, where citizens of the Kingdom wanted to join the federation, which was never ratified.
NFL players Paul Hornung of the Green Bay Packers and Alex Karras of the Detroit Lions were ordered suspended indefinitely by Commissioner Pete Rozelle for betting on league games. Five other Lions players (John Gordy, Gary Lowe, Joe Schmidt, Wayne Walker and Sam Williams) were fined $2,000 each for betting on the Packers to win the 1962 NFL Championship Game. Hornung and Karras would be reinstated by Rozelle eleven months later after being barred from playing during the 1963 NFL season.

April 18, 1963 (Thursday)
The Toronto Maple Leafs beat the Detroit Red Wings, 3–1 in Toronto, to win the NHL Stanley Cup, four games to one.
Died:
Yetta Grotofent, 42, tightrope walker who had been part of The Flying Wallendas high wire act under the stage name "Miss Rietta". The sister-in-law of Karl Wallenda fell  to her death while performing at the Shrine Circus in the Civic Auditorium in Omaha, Nebraska. Two other members of the circus troupe had been killed after falling from the high wire in Detroit on January 30, 1962.
Hemendra Kumar Roy, 74, Bengali children's writer

April 19, 1963 (Friday)
Under pressure from the United States, South Korea's President Park Chung Hee returned to his pledge to return to civilian rule, and announced that multiparty elections for the presidency and the National Assembly would take place before the end of the year.  Park had promised a return to democracy in 1963 when he had taken power in a coup on August 12, 1961, but on March 16, 1963, proposed to extend military rule for another four years.  The voting (in which Park would be elected president) would be held on October 15.
Born: Valerie Plame, American CIA Operations Officer who was identified after a leak from a U.S. State Department official; in Anchorage, Alaska.

April 20, 1963 (Saturday)
Italy created its first space agency, the Istituto Nazionale per le Richerche Spaziali (IRS) (National Institute for Space Research).
The caves at Lascaux were closed to the general public after fifteen years, in order to protect cave paintings dating from more than 17,000 years ago. The paintings had been rediscovered on September 12, 1940, in the caverns in southwestern France. After the complex was opened to the public in 1948, the works began to erode from carbonic acid produced by the exhalations of the visitors. The Department of Dordogne would create a replica of the paintings in another cave hall, opened as "Lascaux II" in 1983.
The 1963 Pan American Games opened in São Paulo, Brazil.
The final water condensate tank was installed in Mercury spacecraft 20 for the MA-9 mission. In operation, the astronaut hand-pumped the fluid to the 3.6-pound tank to avoid spilling moisture inside the cabin from the built-in tank. Then the 1-pound containers were available.
In Montreal, the terrorist campaign of the Front de libération du Québec claimed its first fatality. William Vincent O'Neill, a 65-year-old night watchman and janitor, died in the explosion of a bomb at a Canadian Army recruitment center. O'Neill, who was planning to retire at the end of May, had been scheduled to start his shift at midnight, but had arrived at 11:30 to allow a co-worker to go home, and was killed when the bomb exploded at 11:45 pm.
Died: Julián Grimau, 41, Spanish Communist leader, was executed by a firing squad despite pleas to Spanish dictator Francisco Franco for clemency.

April 21, 1963 (Sunday)
The first elections for the Supreme Institution of the Baháʼí Faith (known as the Universal House of Justice, whose seat is at the Baháʼí World Centre on Mount Carmel in Haifa, Israel) were held, with voting open until April 23.
Hussein ibn Nasser replaced Samir al-Rifai as Prime Minister of Jordan.
Jim Clark won the 1963 Imola Grand Prix (in Italy).
A. J. Foyt won the USAC Championship Car event at Trenton Speedway (New Jersey).
Born: "Towser the Mouser", Scottish cat who earned a spot in the Guinness Book of World Records for catching 28,899 mice over more than 23 years (d. 1987)

April 22, 1963 (Monday)
Lester Bowles Pearson became the 14th Prime Minister of Canada. The oath was administered by Governor-General Georges Vanier in Ottawa at Vanier's office, where Pearson presented the names of his 25-member cabinet.
Robert Taschereau took office as the 11th Chief Justice of Canada, replacing Patrick Kerwin, who had died on February 2.
Cuba released its last American prisoners, 27 men who had been incarcerated by the Castro government. Twenty-one were flown from Havana to Miami after New York lawyer James Donovan had negotiated their freedom. Another six elected to go to other nations rather than returning to the U.S.
President Kennedy started the one-year countdown for the opening of the 1964 New York World's Fair by keying "1964" on a touch-tone telephone in the Oval Office, starting "a contraption which will count off the seconds until the opening". Kennedy then spoke over the line to a crowd of about 1,000 people at Flushing Meadow Park, and said "Three hundred sixty-six days from today, I plan to attend your opening". President Kennedy would be killed, however, exactly five months before the Fair's opening on April 22, 1964.
Mercury spacecraft 20 was moved from Hanger S at Cape Canaveral to Complex 14 and mated to Atlas launch vehicle 130-D in preparation for the Mercury-Atlas 9 (MA-9) mission. The first simulated flight test was begun immediately.
After Mercury spacecraft 20 was mated to Atlas launch vehicle 130-D, a prelaunch electrical mate and abort test and a joint flight compatibility test were made. During the latter, some difficulty developed in the flight control gyro canisters, causing replacement of the components; a rerun of this portion of the test was scheduled for May 1, 1963.
The Bendix Corporation reported to the Manned Spacecraft Center that it had completed the design and fabrication of an air lock for the Mercury spacecraft. This component was designed to collect micrometeorites during orbital flight. Actually, the air lock could accommodate a wide variety of experiments, such as ejecting objects into space and into reentry trajectories and exposing objects to a space environment for observation and retrieval for later study. Because of the modular construction, the air lock could be adapted to the Gemini and Apollo spacecraft.
Scott Carpenter told an audience at the American Institute of Aeronautics and Astronautics' Second Manned Space Flight Meeting in Dallas, Texas, that the Mercury program would culminate with the 1-day mission of Gordon Cooper.
Representatives of Air Force Space Systems Division (SSD), Manned Spacecraft Center, and Lockheed met in Sunnyvale for the first management review of the Gemini Agena target vehicle (GATV). Patterned after similar meetings regularly held between SSD, Lewis Research Center, and Lockheed on medium space vehicle satellite and probe programs, the Gemini Target Management Review Meetings encompassed a comprehensive monthly review of the status of the GATV program.

April 23, 1963 (Tuesday)
The Ukrainian football club FC Karpaty Lviv played its first official match, defeating Lokomotiv Gomel 1–0.
Ludwig Erhard was chosen as the successor for retiring West German Chancellor Konrad Adenauer, despite Adenauer's recommendations that the Christian Democratic Party and the Christian Socialist Union Bundestag members choose another person. Erhard, who had been the nation's Economic Minister since 1950, was approved by a vote of 159 to 47.
The Gemini Abort Panel met on April 23 and 24. Martin-Baltimore's analysis of the last three Titan II flight tests tended to show that successful crew escape would have been possible. McDonnell presented data on spacecraft structural capabilities, but lack of data on what to expect from Titan II catastrophic failure meant that spacecraft structural capabilities remained a problem. Also some questions had existed as to what could happen to the adapter retrosection during and after an abort. A study had been made of this problem, assuming a  altitude condition, and there appeared to be no separation difficulties. This study investigated the period of up to 10 seconds after separation, and there was no evidence that recontact would occur.
Died: Yitzhak Ben-Zvi, 78, second and longest-serving (1952-1963) President of Israel. Speaker Kadish Luz became acting president until Zalman Shazar was selected by the Knesset.

April 24, 1963 (Wednesday)
The Boston Celtics defeated the Los Angeles Lakers, 112–109, to win their fifth consecutive NBA championship, four games to two.
The Vienna Convention on Consular Relations was signed, and would enter into force on March 19, 1967.
Princess Alexandra of Kent, first cousin of Queen Elizabeth II, married The Hon. Angus Ogilvy at Westminster Abbey, London.
Died: Leonid Lukov, 53, Soviet film director and screenwriter

April 25, 1963 (Thursday)
The United States removed the last of its Jupiter missiles from Turkey, completing an agreement that had been reached with the Soviet Union after the Cuban Missile Crisis of 1962. 
The 12th Syracuse Grand Prix took place in Sicily and was won by Jo Siffert.
Born: Michael Waltrip, American race car driver, winner of Daytona 500 in 2001 and 2003; in Owensboro, Kentucky

April 26, 1963 (Friday)
Israel signed an agreement with Dassault Aviation to acquire MD-620 short-range missiles, to which Israel would give the name Jericho-1.
The third and final launch of the US's expendable launch system Scout X-2M ended in a failure, without reaching orbit.
Basil Brooke, 1st Viscount Brookeborough, became Lord Lieutenant of Fermanagh.
Born: Jet Li, Chinese film actor, film producer, martial artist and wushu champion, as Li Lianjie in Beijing

April 27, 1963 (Saturday)
The U.S. Marine Corps lost its first aircraft to enemy action in Vietnam, when Viet Cong ground fire shot down a UH-34D transport helicopter near Do Xa, South Vietnam.
Final design review of complex 14 modifications and activation of facilities was held under the aegis of Air Force Space Systems Division (SSD) in Los Angeles. All drawings and specifications were accepted. SSD's activation of the complex was scheduled to begin January 1, 1964, with an estimated 10 months required to prepare complex 14 for Project Gemini Atlas-Agena launches.
Bob Hayes became the first person to run the 100-meter dash in less than ten seconds, in 9.9 seconds at a meet in Los Angeles. However, the accomplishment could not be recognized as a world record because the wind was faster than 5 meters per second (18 km/h or 11.2 mph); the barrier would be broken on October 14, 1968, by Jim Hines at 9.95 seconds.
Born: Russell T Davies, Welsh television producer and screenwriter, in Swansea

April 28, 1963 (Sunday)
In the Italian general election, voting was held for all 630 seats in the Chamber of Deputies and 315 of the 321 seats in the Senate of the Republic.  Although the Christian Democratic Party of Aldo Moro retained control with 260 (38.3%) of the Deputies' and 129 (36.6%) of the Senate seats, the Italian Communist Party of Palmiro Togliatti almost doubled its presence in the lower chamber, from 85 to 166 seats, for the second largest number.
The 17th Tony Awards ceremony took place in New York City.

April 29, 1963 (Monday)
Andrew Loog Oldham, 19, signed a contract with The Rolling Stones, becoming their manager. Oldham had seen the band in concert the previous day at the Crawdaddy Club in London.
NASA Headquarters approved rescheduling of the Gemini flight program as proposed by Gemini Project Office (GPO). Late delivery of the spacecraft systems coupled with the unexpectedly small number of Mercury systems incorporated in the Gemini spacecraft had forced GPO to review the flight program critically. In the revised program, the first flight was still set for December 1963 and was still to be uncrewed, but it was now to be orbital rather than suborbital to flight-qualify launch vehicle subsystems and demonstrate the compatibility of the launch vehicle and spacecraft; no separation or recovery was planned. The second mission, originally a crewed orbital flight, now became an uncrewed suborbital ballistic flight scheduled for July 1964. Its primary object was to test spacecraft reentry under maximum heating-rate reentry conditions; it would also qualify the launch vehicle and all spacecraft systems required for crewed orbital flight. The third flight, formerly planned as a crewed orbital rendezvous mission, became the first crewed flight, a short-duration (probably three-orbit) systems evaluation flight scheduled for October 1964. Subsequent flights were to follow at three-month intervals, ending in January 1967. Rendezvous terminal maneuvers were planned for missions 3 (if flight duration permitted) and 4, a seven-day mission using a rendezvous pod. The sixth flight was to be a 14-day long-duration mission identical to 4 except that no rendezvous maneuver missions with the Atlas-launched Agena D target vehicle. Water landing by parachute was planned for the first six flights and land landing by paraglider from flight 7 on.
Five Latin American nations— Mexico, Brazil, Bolivia, Chile and Ecuador— announced their agreement to a proposal by Mexican President Adolfo López Mateos to prohibit the placement of nuclear weapons in their territory.

April 30, 1963 (Tuesday)
The Lebanese cargo ship Aghios Georgios caught fire off Eastbourne, East Sussex, United Kingdom. The crew were safely rescued, and the ship was beached at Norman's Bay.

As of this date, a number of improvements had been made to the Mercury pressure suit for the Mercury-Atlas 9 (MA-9) flight. These included a mechanical seal for the helmet, new gloves with an improved inner-liner and link netting between the inner and outer fabrics at the wrist, and an increased mobility torso section. The MA-9 boots were integrated with the suit to provide additional comfort for the longer mission, to reduce weight, and to provide an easier and shorter donning time. Another change relocated the life vest from the center of the chest to a pocket on the lower left leg. This modification removed the bulkiness from the front of the suit and provided for more comfort during the flight. These were only a few of the changes.
In a NASA position paper, stimulated by U.S. Secretary of Defense Robert McNamara's testimony on the fiscal year 1964 budget and an article in Missiles and Rockets'' interpreting his statements, Robert C. Seamans, Jr., NASA Associate Administrator, stressed NASA's primary management responsibility in the Gemini program. McNamara's remarks had been interpreted as presaging an Air Force take-over of Project Gemini. Seamans recognized the vital role of the U.S. Department of Defense in Gemini management and operations but insisted that NASA had the final and overall responsibility for program success.
New Hampshire became the first of the United States to legalize a state lottery in the 20th century. The first drawing in the New Hampshire Sweepstakes would take place on March 12, 1964.

References

1963
1963-04
1963-04